Josip Pivarić (born 30 January 1989) is a Croatian professional footballer who plays as a left-back for Prva HNL side Lokomotiva Zagreb.

Club career

Dinamo Zagreb
Pivarić joined the Dinamo Zagreb youth academy at a young age. He was promoted to the first team during the spring of 2008. He went out on loan to Dinamo feeder club Lokomotiva Zagreb that same year, making 13 appearances in his first season with the Lokosi. In January 2009, he signed a seven and a half year contract with Dinamo Zagreb, spending until the end of the 2011–12 season on loan at Lokomotiva.

In January 2012, Pivarić rejoined the senior squad at Dinamo. He made his senior debut for Dinamo on 25 February 2012, in a 0–3 win over Karlovac. His first goal for the Modri came in a 1–1 draw with Rijeka on 21 April 2012.

Pivarić scored a historic goal for Dinamo in September 2015, the opening goal in a famous 2–1 victory over Arsenal in the 2015–16 UEFA Champions League.

In a friendly match against Norwegian side Strømsgodset in January 2016, Pivarić sustained extensive ligament damage to his knee, forcing him out for the remainder of the 2015–16 season and missing out on probable UEFA Euro 2016 national team selection. Pivarić made his return on 6 July 2016, in a 1–0 pre-season friendly victory over Copenhagen.

Dynamo Kyiv
On 8 August 2017, Pivarić signed a three-year contract with Ukrainian club Dynamo Kyiv.

International career
Pivarić made his international debut for the Croatia national football team on 14 August 2013, in a 3–2 win over Liechtenstein in Vaduz.

In May 2018 he was named in Croatia's preliminary 32 man squad for the 2018 World Cup in Russia. Throughout the tournament Ivan Strinić, Croatia's first choice left back, was battling injuries mostly due to his team playing three consecutive extra time matches to get to the final. This allowed Pivarić a great deal of playtime in Croatia's run to the 2018 World Cup Final. He earned a total of 26 caps, scoring no goals. His final international was an October 2018 friendly against Jordan.

Career statistics

Club

International

Honours
Croatia
 FIFA World Cup runner-up: 2018

Orders
 Order of Duke Branimir: 2018

References

External links
 

1989 births
Living people
Footballers from Zagreb
Association football fullbacks
Croatian footballers
Croatia youth international footballers
Croatia international footballers
2018 FIFA World Cup players
GNK Dinamo Zagreb players
NK Lokomotiva Zagreb players
FC Dynamo Kyiv players
First Football League (Croatia) players
Croatian Football League players
Ukrainian Premier League players
Croatian expatriate footballers
Expatriate footballers in Ukraine
Croatian expatriate sportspeople in Ukraine